Abkuhi (also Romanized as Ābkūhī; also known as Ābgūhī and Meydānī) is a village in Piveshk Rural District, Lirdaf District, Jask County, Hormozgan Province, Iran. As of the 2006 census, its population was 409, in 86 families.

References 

Populated places in Jask County